
Allan W. Antliff is an anarchist activist, art critic, author and founding member of the Toronto Anarchist Free School (now Anarchist U) who has written extensively on the topics of anarchism and art in North America since the 1980s.

Career
Since 2003 Antliff has held the Canada Research Chair in Art History at the University of Victoria, where he teaches undergraduate and graduate courses on modern and contemporary art. His research interests include dada, contemporary art, anarchist history and political theory, and his graduate seminars include "20th-Century Anarchism and Avant-Garde Art"; "New York Dada" and "American Modernism Between the Wars". In addition to teaching art history, Antliff co-edits the Alternative Press Review, serves as art editor for Anarchist Studies, edited the volume  Only a Beginning: An Anarchist Anthology (1998) and has written two scholarly books; Anarchist Modernism: Art, Politics and the First American Avant-Garde (2001) and Art and Anarchy: From the Paris Commune to the Fall of the Berlin Wall (2007).

He also is the Director of the Anarchist Archive at the University of Victoria as well.

Selected publications
 Only a Beginning: An Anarchist Anthology. Arsenal Pulp Press (2004) .
 Anarchist Modernism: Art, Politics, and the First American Avant-Garde. University of Chicago Press (2001).
 Anarchy and Art: From the Paris Commune to the Fall of the Berlin Wall. Arsenal Pulp Press (1998).
 Anarchy in Art: Strategies of Dissidence, Anarchist Studies. 11 no. 1 (2003): 66–83.
 Art/Politics/Subterfuge, Mix Magazine. 27 no. 4 (2002): 29–31.
 "Egoist Cyborgs," The Uncanny: Experiments in Cyborg Culture, ed. Bruce Grenville, exh. cat. Vancouver Art Gallery (2002): 101–113.
 "Cosmic Modernism: Elie Nadelman, Adolf Wolff, and the Materialist Aesthetics of John Weichsel," Archives of American Art Journal. 38 no. 3 (Winter, 2000): 20–29.
 "Interpellating Modernity: Cubism and 'La Vie Unanime' in America," American Modernism Across the Arts, eds. Jay Bochner and Justin Edwards, Peter Lang Publishers, 1999.

References

Further reading

External links
Academic profile
Personal website Retrieved 2 December 2013.

1957 births
Living people
American anarchists
American art critics
American art historians
American male non-fiction writers
Anarchist writers
Anarcho-communists
Canada Research Chairs

Canadian anarchists